Simon Heath (born 1977 in Stockholm) is a Swedish composer known for his work with Za Frûmi, Atrium Carceri, Abnocto and Krusseldorf.  Heath also co-founded Za Frûmi with Simon Kölle and Donald Person.  Heath has several other projects and also works on mastering other artists in the dark ambient scene. He is the founder of the dark ambient label Cryo Chamber.

References

Swedish composers
Swedish male composers
Living people
1977 births